This is a list of rijksmonuments in Gelderland that have articles on the English language Wikipedia.

A

B

C

D

E

L

N

O

S

W

Z

 
Gelderland
Buildings and structures in Gelderland